The Iberomaurusian is a backed bladelet lithic industry found near the coasts of Morocco, Algeria, and Tunisia. It is also known from a single major site in Libya, the Haua Fteah, where the industry is locally known as the Eastern Oranian. The Iberomaurusian seems to have appeared around the time of the Last Glacial Maximum (LGM), somewhere between c. 25,000 and 23,000 cal BP. It would have lasted until the early Holocene c. 11,000 cal BP.

The name of the Iberomaurusian means "of Iberia and Mauretania", the latter being a Latin name for Northwest Africa. Pallary (1909) coined this term to describe assemblages from the site of La Mouillah in the belief that the industry extended over the strait of Gibraltar into the Iberian peninsula. This theory is now generally discounted (Garrod 1938), but the name has stuck.

In Algeria, Tunisia, and Libya, but not in Morocco, the industry is succeeded by the Capsian industry, whose origins are unclear. The Capsian is believed either to have spread into North Africa from the Near East, or to have evolved from the Iberomaurusian. In Morocco and Western Algeria, the Iberomaurusian is succeeded by the Cardial culture after a long hiatus.

Definition

Alternative names 
Because the name of the Iberomaurusian implies Afro-European cultural contact now generally discounted, researchers have proposed other names:

Mouillian or Mouillan, based on the site of La Mouillah (Goetz 1945-6).
The Oranian, based on the Algerian region of Oran (Breuil 1930, Gobert et al. 1932, McBurney 1967, Barker et al. 2012). 
The Late Upper Palaeolithic (of Northwest African facies, Barton et al. 2005).

Timeline of sites 
What follows is a timeline of all published radiocarbon dates from reliably Iberomaurusian contexts, excluding a number of dates produced in the 1960s and 1970s considered "highly doubtful" (Barton et al. 2013). All dates, calibrated and Before Present, are according to Hogue and Barton (2016). The Tamar Hat date beyond 25,000 cal BP is tentative.

Genetics 

In 2013, Iberomaurusian skeletons from the prehistoric sites of Taforalt and Afalou were analyzed for ancient DNA. All of the specimens belonged to maternal clades associated with either North Africa or the northern and southern Mediterranean littoral, indicating gene flow between these areas since the Epipaleolithic. The ancient Taforalt individuals carried the mtDNA Haplogroup N subclades like U6 and M which points to population continuity in the region dating from the Iberomaurusian period.

Loosdrecht et al. (2018) analysed genome-wide data from seven ancient individuals from the Iberomaurusian Grotte des Pigeons site near Taforalt in north-eastern Morocco. The fossils were directly dated to between 15,100 and 13,900 calibrated years before present. The scientists found that all males belonged to haplogroup E1b1b, common among Afroasiatic males. The male specimens with sufficient nuclear DNA preservation belonged to the paternal haplogroup E1b1b1a1 (M78), with one skeleton bearing the E1b1b1a1b1 parent lineage to E-V13, one male specimen belonged to E1b1b (M215*). These Y-DNA clades 24,000 years BP had a common ancestor with the Berbers and the E1b1b1b (M123) subhaplogroup that has been observed in skeletal remains belonging to the Epipaleolithic Natufian and Pre-Pottery Neolithic cultures of the Levant. Maternally, the Taforalt remains bore the U6a and M1b mtDNA haplogroups, which are common among modern Afroasiatic-speaking populations in Africa. A two-way admixture scenario using Natufian and modern sub-Saharan samples (including West Africans and the Tanzanian Hadza) as reference populations inferred that the seven Taforalt individuals are best modeled genetically as of 63.5% Natufian-related and 36.5% sub-Saharan ancestry (with the latter having both West African-like and Hadza-like affinities), with no apparent gene flow from the Epigravettian culture of Paleolithic southern Europe however this model totally failed and was proven wrong in the same aforementionned study. Laziridis 2018 showed Iberomaurisians derived their lineage from a unique population called Ancestral North African (ANA), this ancestral population also contributed 13% ancestry into Mesolithic Natufians of the Levant , as well as a minor 12,5% Iberomaurisian-like gene flow into Modern West Africans (best proxied by Yoruba).  The scientists indicated that further ancient DNA testing at other Iberomaurusian archaeological sites would be necessary to determine whether the Taforalt samples were representative of the broader Iberomaurusian gene pool.

Martiniano et al. (2022) later reassigned all the Taforalt samples to haplogroup E-M78 and none to E-L618, the predecessor to EV13.

See also
Afroasiatic Urheimat
Aterian
Mushabian
Taforalt
Ifri N'Ammar
Mechta-Afalou
Haua Fteah

Notes

References

Upper Paleolithic cultures of Africa
Industries (archaeology)
Archaeology of Algeria
Archaeology of Libya
Archaeological cultures in Morocco
Archaeology of Tunisia
Paleolithic cultures of Africa